Noraber (also, Noraberd, Kyalali, and Kalali) is a town in the Shirak Province of Armenia.

References 

Populated places in Shirak Province